is a railway station on the Shinano Railway Line in the city of Chikuma, Nagano, Japan, operated by the third-sector railway operating company Shinano Railway.

Lines
Yashiro Kōkō-mae Station is served by the Shinano Railway Line and is 61.8 kilometers from the starting point of the line at Karuizawa Station.

Station layout
The station consists of two opposed side platforms serving two tracks, connected to the station building by a footbridge.

Platforms

Adjacent stations

History 
Yashiro Kōkō-mae Station opened on 22 March 2001.

Passenger statistics
In fiscal 2011, the station was used by an average of 1,530 passengers daily.

Surrounding area
Yashiro High School
Mori Shogunzuka Kofun
Nagano Prefectural History Museum

See also
List of railway stations in Japan

References

External links

  

Railway stations in Japan opened in 2001
Railway stations in Nagano Prefecture
Shinano Railway Line
Chikuma, Nagano